The discography of Japanese-American singer-songwriter Ai consists of twelve studio albums, four extended plays (EP), seven compilation albums, one live album, one mix tape, ten video albums and numerous solo and collaboration singles.

Ai debuted as a musician through RCA in 2000, though which she released a single album, My Name Is Ai (2001). In 2002, Ai signed to Def Jam Japan, a subsidiary of Universal Music Japan, and released her second studio album, Original Ai (2003). 2004 Ai, her third studio album, peaked at number three on the Oricon Albums Chart and received a Gold certification from the Recording Industry Association of Japan. Signing to Island Records near the end of 2004, Ai released the ballad "Story" in 2005, which became one of the most digitally successful songs of all time in Japan, becoming 3× Million certified for ringtones and million for downloads to cellphones. Following this success, her fourth studio album, Mic-a-holic Ai (2005), was released and peaked at number 4 on the Oricon charts and was certified 2× Platinum by the RIAJ and became one of Ai's best-selling albums. In 2006, Ai released the songs "Believe" and "I Wanna Know". Both singles peaked in the top ten of the Oricon Singles Chart. Ai's fifth studio album, What's Goin' On Ai (2006), was released shortly after and peaked at number 2. The next year, Ai released her sixth studio album, Don't Stop Ai (2007), which saw similar success, peaking at number 4. Ai's seventh studio album, Viva Ai (2009), was released and peaked at number 10. It was supported by the singles "I'll Remember You", "One" and "Taisetsu na Mono". Both "I'll Remember You" and "One" were certified Gold by the RIAJ. Later that year, Ai scored her first number one with her greatest hits album, Best Ai (2009). 

Ai's eighth studio album, The Last Ai (2010), was released in celebration of her tenth anniversary in the music industry. The album featured a variety of artists, including American rapper Snoop Dogg, Japanese singer Namie Amuro, Miliyah Kato and American singer Chaka Khan. Both Khan and Ai were nominated for and won the International Collaboration Special Award at the 2010 Billboard Japan Music Awards for the song "One More Try" and a cover of "Through the Fire". In 2011, Ai left Universal and signed a global publishing deal with EMI. Signing to EMI Music Japan, she released her ninth studio album, Independent (2012), which served as her international debut. The album was led by the single "Letter in the Sky", which featured American pop band The Jacksons. Its second single, "Happiness", was used as a commercial theme song for Coca-Cola's Christmas campaign in Japan from 2011 to 2015. Near the end of 2012, Ai announced she would release an album in the United States, however the album was never released.

In 2013, EMI was acquired by Universal, which led to Ai returning to Universal under the EMI Records Japan label. Her tenth studio album, Moriagaro (2013), was released and peaked at number five on the Oricon charts. A re-issue album, Motto Moriagaro, was released later that year. In 2014, Ai was transferred to EMI Records as Nayutawave Records and EMI Records Japan were merged to form the label. In 2016, Ai's sales were revitalized from the sleeper hit, "Minna ga Minna ga Eiyū". The song was included on a 2016 deluxe release of her greatest hits album, The Best. The album peaked at number 2 on the Billboard Japan Hot Albums chart and was certified Gold by the RIAJ. She later signed a record deal with Def Jam Recordings alongside her current record deal with EMI.

In 2017, Ai's eleventh studio album, Wa to Yo, was released and served as her second international album. In November 2019, her first international greatest hits album, Kansha!!!!! - Thank You for 20 Years New and Best was released. In celebration of her twentieth anniversary, Ai released the extended plays, It's All Me, Vol. 1 (2020) and It's All Me, Vol. 2 (2021).

In June 2021, Ai's previous releases with Universal Sigma, Island Records and Def Jam Japan were made available for digital streaming outside of Asia. In November 2021, she released the single "Aldebaran", which received critical acclaim from critics. The song ultimately boosted the sales of her twelfth studio album, Dream (2022), which peaked at number 12 on the Oricon Albums Chart and number 11 on the Billboard Japan Hot Albums chart.

Studio albums

Reissues

Compilation albums

Extended plays

Compilation extended plays

Live albums

Mix tapes

Singles

As lead artist

2000s

2010s

2020s

As a featured artist

Promotional singles

Other appearances

Video albums

Music videos

Notes

References

Discography
Discographies of Japanese artists
Discographies of American artists
Hip hop discographies
Pop music discographies
Contemporary R&B discographies